Richard Jones is a British photojournalist, based in Hong Kong. In 2009 he was the victim of an assault by Grace Mugabe and her bodyguard.

Jones' work related to China's One-Child Policy has won numerous Human Rights Press Awards and a National Press Photographers Association Award. He won the Photojournalism category at the Photography Masters Cup International Color Awards in 2009. He was nominated and "Highly Commended" in the Foreign Reporter of the Year category at the UK Press Awards in 2010.

References

Year of birth missing (living people)
Living people
Welsh expatriates in Hong Kong